The Noire River (in Frenche: Rivière Noire) is a tributary of the Bulstrode River whose current flows successively into the Nicolet River and St. Lawrence River. The Rivière Noire flows through the municipalities of Princeville, Saint-Rosaire and Saint-Valère, in the Arthabaska Regional County Municipality, in the administrative region of Centre-du-Québec, in Quebec, in Canada.

Geography 

The neighboring geographical slopes of the Black River are:
 north side: Blanche River;
 east side: Bulstrode River;
 south side: Bulstrode River;
 west side: Bulstrode River, Béland stream, Blanche River.

The Rivière Noire takes its source from various agricultural streams, north of the town of Victoriaville, south-east of the village of Saint-Rosaire and south-west of the village of Princeville.

  westward, to the limit of the municipality of Saint-Rosaire;
  west to route 162;
  westward, to the third crossing of eighth rang, which is located at the confluence of the Pimbina river;
  towards the west, passing north of the village of Saint-Valère, to its mouth.

Toponymy 

The toponym "rivière Noire" was made official on December 5, 1968, at the Commission de toponymie du Québec.
The origin possibly comes from nearby peatlands.

See also 
 List of rivers of Quebec

References 

Arthabaska Regional County Municipality
Rivers of Centre-du-Québec